The STS-51-L mission started with the ignition of Challenger's main engines until the remote destruction of the two Solid rocket boosters (SRBs), and includes a transcript of crew conversations from the cockpit voice recorder on board the orbiter. STS-51-L was the twenty-fifth flight in the American Space Shuttle program, and marked the first time a civilian had flown aboard the Space Shuttle. The mission used Space Shuttle Challenger, which lifted off from launch pad 39B (LC-39B) on January 28, 1986, from Kennedy Space Center, Florida. The mission ended in disaster following the destruction of Challenger 73 seconds after lift-off, because of the failure of an O-ring seals on Challengers right solid rocket booster, which led to the rapid disintegration of the Space Shuttle stack from overwhelming aerodynamic pressures.

Summary timeline 

Following several days of lengthy delays, Challenger finally lifted off at 16:38:00 UTC on January 28, 1986. Her three main engines were ignited at T-6.6 seconds, and at T-0 the solid rocket boosters were ignited, lifting the shuttle stack off launchpad LC-39B at Kennedy Space Center. Almost immediately, cameras recording the launch registered the presence of smoke at the field joint next to the attachment strut on the right-hand SRB, indicating the failure of the O-rings that were supposed to seal the joint against the "blow-by" of hot gases from the boosters. However, sometime at around T+2 seconds, a piece of solid fuel from inside the booster moved inside the joint and provided a temporary seal against the blow-by, allowing the launch to proceed normally for around forty seconds.

The pitch and yaw commanded by the shuttle's computers in order to counter this wind caused the solid fuel plug to become dislodged from the field joint on the right SRB.

At around T+58 seconds, cameras noted the creation of a plume on the aft attachment strut on the right-hand SRB, as ignited gas began to force itself through a rapidly growing hole in the field joint. Within a second, the plume became well defined and intense. Internal pressure in the right SRB began to drop because of the rapidly enlarging hole in the failed joint, and at T+60 seconds there was visual evidence of flame coming through the joint and impinging on the external tank (ET). As the mission clock passed up through T+64 seconds, the plume suddenly changed shape, showing that it had burned a hole in the liquid hydrogen tank in Challengers ET, causing the tank to leak. The pressure in the tank began to drop, and Challengers onboard computers began to pivot the nozzles of the SSMEs to counter the now-unbalanced thrust between the two SRBs.

At this stage, the situation still seemed normal both to the astronauts and to flight controllers. At T+68, the CAPCOM informed the crew – "Challenger, go at throttle up", and Commander Francis R. "Dick" Scobee confirmed the call. His response, "Roger, go at throttle up", was the last communication from Challenger on the air-to-ground loop.

At around T+72 seconds, the right SRB apparently pulled away from the aft strut attaching it to the external tank. Later analysis of telemetry data showed a sudden lateral acceleration to the right at T+72.525 seconds, which may have been felt by the crew. The last statement captured by the crew cabin recorder came just half a second after this acceleration, when Pilot Michael J. Smith said, "Uh oh". Smith may also have been responding to onboard indications of main engine performance or to falling pressures in the external fuel tank.

At T+73.124 seconds, the aft dome of the liquid hydrogen tank failed, producing a propulsive force that pushed the hydrogen tank into the liquid oxygen tank in the forward part of the external tank. At the same time, the right SRB rotated about the forward attach strut, and struck the intertank structure.

The breakup of the vehicle began at T+73.162 seconds, at an altitude of ). With the external tank disintegrating, Challenger veered from its correct attitude with respect to the local air flow and was immediately torn apart by aerodynamic forces, resulting in a load factor of up to 20g – well over its design limit. The two SRBs, which could withstand greater aerodynamic loads, separated from the ET and continued in uncontrolled powered flight for another 37 seconds. The boosters were destroyed by the range safety system at around 110 seconds after launch.

Detailed timeline and transcript 
The following timeline provides a detailed list of the major events of the launch of STS-51-L, culminating in the destruction of Challenger. The list also contains a transcript from the shuttle's Cockpit Voice Recorder (CVR), from ignition of the main engines to T+73 seconds. Acronyms used in the timeline are as follows:

 APU – Auxiliary Power Unit
 CAPCOM – Capsule Communicator (Richard O. Covey)
 CDR – Commander (Francis R. "Dick" Scobee)
 CVR – Cockpit Voice Recorder
 DPS - Data Processing Systems
 ET – External Tank
 FIDO – Flight Dynamics Officer
 GLS – Ground Launch Sequencer
 GPC – General Purpose Computer
 HPFT – High-Pressure Fuel Turbopump
 LH2 – Liquid Hydrogen
 LO2 – Liquid Oxygen (same as LOX)
 LVLH – Local Vertical Local Horizontal
 MCC – Mission Control Center
 MEC – Main Engine Controller
 MPS - Main Propulsion System
 MS1/MS2 – Mission Specialist (Ellison S. Onizuka/Judith A. Resnik)
 PAO – Public Affairs Officer
 PIC – Pyrotechnics Initiator Controller
 PLT – Pilot (Michael J. Smith)
 psf – pounds per square foot
 psi – pounds per square inch
 RCS – Reaction Control System
 SRB – Solid Rocket Booster
 SSME - Space Shuttle Main Engine
 TVC - Thrust Vector Control

References

External links 
 NASA Transcript 
 Spaceflight Now: The Challenger disaster timeline

Spaceflight timelines
Space Shuttle Challenger disaster